Arati Ankalikar-Tikekar (born 27 January 1963) is an Indian classical singer who is active mostly in Marathi, Konkani and Hindi film Industry; known for singing in Agra as well as Gwalior and Jaipur style. She has received two National Film Awards for Best Female Playback Singer.

Ankalikar-Tikekar has been credited by audio cassettes and CD recordings. She was the main playback singer for the Sham Benegal's film, Sardari Begum. She is known for her albums Tejomay Nadbrahm, Raag-Rang, and, playback for the movies Antarnaad, De dhakka, Savlee, and the hit Sardari Begum, Ek Hazarachi Note. Her daughter Swanandi Tikekar who is in her mid-twenties is an actress.
Her Guru was, well-known Hindustani Sangeet vocalist Padmavibhushan Kishori Amonkar.

As a singer
She has been the main playback singer for several Marathi, Konkani as well as Hindi films, namely:
Sardari Begum, 1996
Savlee
De Dhakka, 2008
Dil Dosti Etc
Dhusar
Samhitha, 2013.

TV appearances
Ankalikar-Tikekar has made appearances on television interviews, Reality Shows and as a guest judge on music shows. The following list consists few appearances on Marathi television networks.

Performances 
Ankalikar-Tikekar has performed all over the world at prestigious venues, including the Aga Khan Museum in Toronto, Canada in 2019 for the Raag-Mala Music Society of Toronto.

Accomplishments and awards

Ankalikar-Tikekar received her first National Film Award for Best Female Playback Singer for the Konkani cinema, Anternaad, based on the life of a classical singer for the year 2006.

She received Maharashtra State Film Awards, for the Marathi Film, De Dhakka. Later, in 2013, she was awarded with National Film Award for Best Female Playback Singer for the second time in the Marathi movie, Samhita. She is married to Indian film actor, Uday Tikekar. Her daughter Swanandi Tikekar is a well known marathi television and theatre actress.she received Sangeet natak akademi award .

References

External links
 Profile at Center for the Performing Arts of India (University of Pittsburgh)
http://www.itcsra.org/aom/artist_ofthe_month.asp?id=93

Living people
20th-century Indian women classical singers
Marathi playback singers
Marathi-language singers
1963 births
Best Female Playback Singer National Film Award winners
Singers from Karnataka
Women artists from Karnataka
21st-century Indian women classical singers
People from Bijapur, Karnataka
Recipients of the Sangeet Natak Akademi Award